The Horsham–Montgomery Bridge is a stone bridge that carries Pennsylvania Route 152 (Limekiln Pike) over the Little Neshaminy Creek in Montgomery County, Pennsylvania, United States. Lower State Road merges with Limekiln Pike southwest of the bridge, and diverts from it northeast of the bridge. Lower State Road, including its passage over the bridge, forms the border between Horsham and Montgomery Townships.

Built in 1839, the multiple-span arch bridge is an excellent example of 19th-century stone highway bridges.

The Horsham–Montgomery Bridge was listed on the U.S. National Register of Historic Places in 1988.

References

Road bridges on the National Register of Historic Places in Pennsylvania
Bridges completed in 1839
Bridges in Montgomery County, Pennsylvania
National Register of Historic Places in Montgomery County, Pennsylvania
Stone arch bridges in the United States